Pleuroceras is a genus of fungi in the family Gnomoniaceae. The genus was first described by H. Riess in 1854. Several species in the genus are plant pathogens. The genus contains 12 species.

Species 

P. arollanum
P. bottnicum
P. ciliatum
P. cryptoderis
P. gleditschiae
P. groenlandicum
P. helveticum
P. insulare
P. labradorense
P. lirelliformis
P. lobeliae
P. oregonense
P. pleurostylum
P. populi
P. propinquum
P. pseudoplatani
P. quercicola
P. quercinum
P. rousseaui
P. sassafras
P. tenellum
P. virgularum

References

External links 

 Pleuroceras at Index Fungorum

Gnomoniaceae
Fungal plant pathogens and diseases
Sordariomycetes genera